Geoffrey Davion (born Geoffrey Davison, 27 January 1940 in South Shields, County Durham, died 13 February 1996 in Westminster, London) was an English television and Shakespearean stage actor, notably starring alongside Alun Armstrong in the popular series The Stars Look Down. He starred as Superintendent Nash in the TV film Marple: The Moving Finger from 1985.
He also acted in the cult classic film Clockwise and has worked with many other notable actors such as Ian McKellen and Kenneth Branagh. His niece is actress Rebecca Davison.

Filmography
Clockwise (1986) - Policeman at Crash #2

References

External links 
 

English male stage actors
English male television actors
English male film actors
People from South Shields
Male actors from Tyne and Wear
1940 births
1996 deaths